Yovchev is a Bulgarian masculine surname, its feminine counterpart is Yovcheva. It may refer to
Aleksandar Yovchev (born 1996), Bulgarian football player
Mincho Yovchev (1942–2020), Bulgarian politician
Stanko Yovchev (born 1988), Bulgarian football player
Tsvetlin Yovchev (born 1964),  Bulgarian politician
Yordan Yovchev (born 1973), Bulgarian gymnast
Yovcho Yovchev (born 1991), Bulgarian cyclist

Bulgarian-language surnames